The 2011 ITU Triathlon World Cup was a series of triathlon races organised by the International Triathlon Union (ITU) for elite-level triathletes to be held during the 2011 season. For 2011, nine races were announced as part of the World Cup series. The ninth and final race in Auckland, New Zealand was added as a test race for the 2012 ITU World Triathlon Series Grand Final. Each race was held over a distance of 1500 m swim, 40 km cycle, 10 km run (an Olympic-distance triathlon). Alongside a prize purse, points were awarded at each race contributing towards the overall 2011 ITU Triathlon World Championships point totals.

Venues, dates and prize purses

Event results

Mooloolaba

Ishigaki

Monterrey

Edmonton

Tiszaújváros

Huatulco

Tongyeong

Guatapé

Overnight rains in the region forced organizers to shorten the course from an Olympic distance event to a sprint distance event.

Auckland

See also
2011 ITU Triathlon World Championships

References

2011
World Cup